HYLAS (or HYLAS-1) is a British satellite in geostationary orbit. HYLAS, which is an acronym for Highly Adaptable Satellite, is a communications satellite and was launched by the European Ariane 5 launch vehicle from the Guyana Space Centre at Kourou in French Guiana. It is located at the orbital location of 33.5 degrees west and will provide new and innovative services including High Definition Television (HDTV) and interactive satellite delivered broadband services.
 The satellite will help address the issue of poor broadband coverage in many parts of Europe which have less developed ground infrastructure.

Construction
HYLAS was constructed by EADS Astrium for the UK telecommunications company Avanti Communications Plc. Development of the satellite was supported by a £23m investment from the British National Space Centre (BNSC).

Launch
Avanti purchased for HYLAS a launch to geostationary transfer orbit (GTO) on a Falcon 9 launch vehicle. The purchase, in September 2007, made Avanti the first customer to purchase a commercial geostationary launch from SpaceX. In July 2009 Arianespace announced that HYLAS would instead be launched in 2010, "using an Ariane 5 or Soyuz launcher" from Arianespace. Avanti had previously criticized Arianespace as being overly expensive, but a move to Arianespace was motivated by prospective customers' concerns about launch risks associated with Falcon 9. Also, additional financial assets became available, including 10.7 million pounds from British contributions ESA's Artes telecommunications development program.

HYLAS successfully launched at 18:41 GMT on the 26 November 2010 by Ariane 5.

Mission
HYLAS is based on the Indian Space Research Organisation's I-2K small satellite platform under a cooperative arrangement between EADS Astrium and ISRO/Antrix.

The HYLAS payload carries two Ku band transponders, intended mainly for HDTV, and six Ka band transponders feeding up to eight Spotbeams, allowing the provision of between 150,000 and 300,000 simultaneous broadband Internet connections. The HYLAS satellite had a launch mass of around 2100 kg and a beginning-of-life power of 3.5 kW.

Orbital position 
The orbital position of HYLAS was adjusted to 18.3° West Longitude during June 2019.

See also

HYLAS-2
HYLAS-3

References

External links
Astrium Programme Manager for HYLAS 1, presents in a video satellite's characteristics
Avanti PLC HYLAS 1 homepage
Avanti Hylas Worldwide sales and install service.

Spacecraft launched in 2010
Satellites of the United Kingdom
European Space Agency satellites
Communications satellites in geostationary orbit
Ariane commercial payloads